is a Japanese former swimmer. She competed in the women's 4 × 100 metre freestyle relay at the 1952 Summer Olympics.

References

External links
 

1931 births
Possibly living people
Japanese female freestyle swimmers
Olympic swimmers of Japan
Swimmers at the 1952 Summer Olympics
Place of birth missing (living people)